As part of the MCC tour of India and Ceylon in 1926/27, MCC visited Burma to play two first-class matches: against Rangoon Gymkhana at the Gymkhana Ground, Rangoon from 9–10 January 1927 and against Burma at the Burma Athletic Association Ground, Rangoon  from 12–13 January 1927.

In all, 16 cricketers represented Burma and Rangoon Gymkhana in first-class matches. While some of the cricketers listed below represented other teams, the information included is solely for their career with Burma and Rangoon Gymkhana.

Following Burmese Independence in 1948, cricket became a minority sport in the country and while the Myanmar Cricket Federation is now an Affiliate member of the International Cricket Council (ICC) it will be many years before Myanmar plays another first-class match.

List

References

Cricket in Myanmar
Cricketers by team